Jean-Claude Larréché (born 3 July 1947) is a French organizational theorist, and the Alfred H. Heineken Chaired Professor of marketing at INSEAD, a post he has held since 1993. He is known for his pioneering work in the use of computer simulations (i.e. simulation games) in marketing training, his work at INSEAD on marketing excellence and customer focus, and his book The Momentum Effect.

Biography 
Larréché received his degree for Ingénieur en électronique from INSA, Lyon in 1968, his MSc in Computer Science from the University of London in 1969, his MBA, INSEAD and his PhD at the Graduate School of Business of the Stanford University.

After completing his MBA in 1970 Larreche was working as a research assistant an INSEAD when he was asked to assist L’Oreal assess a computerised marketing model they were considering purchasing. He was fascinated by it and "decided to investigate the best places in the world to study marketing modelling." . Larréché is quoted as saying that he chose Stanford for his PhD so that he could study under Dave Montgomery, one of the founders of marketing modelling.

Between 1974 and 1977, working with an assistant, Hubert Gatignon, he developed his work on marketing modelling to create a teaching simulation called Markstrat . Markstrat is a game where teams of students compete against each other in an artificial world under realistic market conditions. It is claimed that Markstrat is now used in 8 out of the top 10 business schools in the world and 25 of the top 30 schools in the US. More recently he developed the simulation DiG - Discovery Innovation Growth a versatile learning tool to develop competencies in innovation, customer centricity, value based marketing, business acumen, leadership and team performance.

In 1983, at the age of just 36 Larréché was appointed to the board of Reckitt & Coleman (now Reckitt Benckiser plc) in a non-executive role after previously working for the firm in a consultancy capacity . He remained on the board for 18 years. He founded a consultancy business, StratX, in 1984. . The company currently offers experiential learning programs for top corporations and universities worldwide.

During the 1990s Larreche’s work began to concentrate on the underlying capabilities that impact on a business’s ability to compete in the marketplace. He published a series of reports based on surveys conducted with more than 1200 executives in hundreds of Fortune 1000 companies. The surveys attempted to define and evaluate the attributes, characteristics and behaviours of large global firms and assess their impact on corporate performance. That work, combined with computer modelling and his long-time work on customer focus, converged on the concept of “momentum” – an attempt to map out a process for improving the efficiency of a firm’s growth. The culmination of this period of Larreche’s work was the publication in 2008 of The Momentum Effect: How to ignite exceptional growth .

He received the following awards:
 1995 – Marketing Educator of the Year, Club 55, the European Community of Marketing Experts.
 1995 – "Best Case of the Year" Award for the Virgin Atlantic Airways case study in Relationship Marketing category, EFMD
 1996 – "Overall European Case of the Year" Award for the Virgin Atlantic Airways case study, ECCH
 1997 – "Best Case of the Year" Award for the First Direct case study in Relationship Marketing category, European Foundation for Management Development (EFMD)
 2000 – "Overall European Case of the Year" Award for the First Direct: Branchless Banking case study, European Case Clearing House (ECCH)

Selected publications 
 
 The Competitive Fitness of Global Firms. (1998–2002). Financial Times Management/Financial Times Prentice Hall.
 Marketing Strategy: A Decision-Focused Approach. 5th ed. (2006). McGraw-Hill. (Co-authors John Mullins, Orville Walker, and Boyd Harper)

References

External links
 Larreche's website

1947 births
Alumni of the University of London
French business theorists
Business educators
Business writers
Marketing people
Marketing theorists
French marketing people
Advertising theorists
Stanford Graduate School of Business alumni
Academic staff of INSEAD
Living people